Buckland St Mary is a village and parish in Somerset, England, situated  to the west of Ilminster and  south of Taunton in the South Somerset district, close to the A303.  The village has a population of 521. The parish is within the Blackdown Hills Area of Outstanding Natural Beauty and includes the hamlet of Birchwood.

History

Nearby is Castle Neroche a Norman motte-and-bailey castle on the site of an earlier hill fort.

The name of the village is thought to mean "land granted by charter" with the addition of the church's dedication.

Buckland was part of the hundred of Abdick and Bulstone.

The village was chosen as Village of the Year for Somerset in the Calor 2008 competition.

Governance

The parish council has responsibility for local issues, including setting an annual precept (local rate) to cover the council's operating costs and producing annual accounts for public scrutiny. The parish council evaluates local planning applications and works with the local police, district council officers, and neighbourhood watch groups on matters of crime, security, and traffic. The parish council's role also includes initiating projects for the maintenance and repair of parish facilities, as well as consulting with the district council on the maintenance, repair, and improvement of highways, drainage, footpaths, public transport, and street cleaning. Conservation matters (including trees and listed buildings) and environmental issues are also the responsibility of the council.

The village falls within the Non-metropolitan district of South Somerset, which was formed on 1 April 1974 under the Local Government Act 1972, having previously been part of Chard Rural District. The district council is responsible for local planning and building control, local roads, council housing, environmental health, markets and fairs, refuse collection and recycling, cemeteries and crematoria, leisure services, parks, and tourism.

Somerset County Council is responsible for running the largest and most expensive local services such as education, social services, libraries, main roads, public transport, policing and fire services, trading standards, waste disposal and strategic planning.

It is also part of the Taunton Deane county constituency represented in the House of Commons of the Parliament of the United Kingdom. It elects one Member of Parliament (MP) by the first past the post system of election. It was part of the South West England constituency of the European Parliament prior to Britain leaving the European Union in January 2020, which elected seven MEPs using the d'Hondt method of party-list proportional representation.

Geography

Long Lye, Deadman, Ruttersleigh and Long Lye Meadow have all been designated as biological Sites of Special Scientific Interest.

School

The school was built in 1851 and enlarged in 1883. The boundary wall incorporates a wellhouse with a drinking fountain which dates from 1876.

Religious sites

The Church of St Mary was built between 1853 and 1863 by Benjamin Ferrey on the site of an earlier church, and has been designated by English Heritage as a Grade II* listed building. Buckland House was built in 1832 as the vicarage but is now a private house.

Birchwood Chapel was built in 1887 when the expansion of Birchwood was, confidently anticipated however this failed to materialise and the chapel now stands in the midst of fields and orchards behind the hamlet.

Cultural references

The parish features in the 1985 book Larksleve and other novels by Patricia Wendorf.

In folklore Buckland St. Mary is said to have a special significance. In folklore Pixies and Fairies are antagonists. They battled at Buckland St. Mary; the Pixies were victorious and still visit the area, whilst the Fairies are said to have left after their loss. Peer-reviewed proof of their presence is scarce.

Notable people
 Robert Hawkins, (1879-1962) Canadian politician, born in the village

References

External links

 Buckland St Mary village web site

Villages in South Somerset
Civil parishes in Somerset